Brandon Jerome Mebane (born January 15, 1985) is a former American football defensive tackle. He attended Crenshaw High School in Los Angeles. He played college football at California. He was drafted by the Seattle Seahawks in the third round of the 2007 NFL Draft. He also played for the Los Angeles Chargers.

College career

Mebane played four seasons at California, recording 109 tackles, 25.5 tackles for a loss, 14.5 sacks, 1 forced fumble, and 1 fumble recovery.

Professional career

Seattle Seahawks
Mebane was selected by the Seattle Seahawks in the 3rd round, 85th overall of the 2007 NFL Draft, and on July 24, he signed a four-year contract. In his rookie season, he played all 16 games and recorded 29 tackles including two sacks. 2008 was a promising year for Mebane as he again played all 16 games and recorded 39 tackles, 5.5 sacks, and 2 forced fumbles. With the departure of Rocky Bernard, Mebane was expected to make a big impact for the Seahawks in 2009 in which he started 15 games and recorded 49 tackles and 1.5 sacks.  For the 2010 season Mebane started the first four games but suffered a calf injury and was forced to sit out the next four games. In the first four games, he had 8 tackles and 1 sack.

Mebane has been a constant in the middle and helped the 2013-2014 Seahawks defense reach dominant heights, as they had one of the best seasons in NFL  history. The Seahawks eventually won Super Bowl XLVIII against the Denver Broncos, 43–8. Mebane, along with defensive linemen Red Bryant, center Max Unger and punter Jon Ryan, were the only 4 holdovers on this Super Bowl team from pre-Carroll/Schneider era.

Fellow Seahawks teammate Richard Sherman was quoted as saying of Mebane: "He's an incredibly technical player in his movements and everything he does. He's rarely out of position and he's rarely out of the play. You rarely see a defensive tackle running making tackles on the sideline, or [making] tackles on screen plays. He does all that. But once again, he's overlooked because I guess he's not a big sack-total guy. He's just a guy that does his job incredibly well week in and week out."

With the Seahawks Mebane anchored the middle of the defensive line for the all-time great Legion of Boom defense.

San Diego / Los Angeles Chargers
On March 9, 2016, Mebane signed a three-year contract with the San Diego Chargers.

On September 5, 2016, Mebane was named one of the San Diego Chargers team captains for the 2016 season. He was placed on injured reserve on November 14, 2016, with a torn bicep.

On March 13, 2019, Mebane re-signed with the Chargers on a two-year contract.

Mebane was released on March 13, 2020.

On November 20, 2020, Mebane announced his retirement from professional football.

References

External links

Seattle Seahawks bio
California Golden Bears bio
NFL career stats

1985 births
African-American players of American football
American football defensive tackles
California Golden Bears football players
Living people
Los Angeles Chargers players
San Diego Chargers players
Seattle Seahawks players
Players of American football from Los Angeles
Crenshaw High School alumni
21st-century African-American sportspeople
20th-century African-American people
Ed Block Courage Award recipients